Passing is a 2021 black-and-white romantic drama film produced, and directed by Rebecca Hall in her feature directorial debut. It is an adaptation of the 1929 novel of the same name by Nella Larsen, and its title refers to African-Americans who had skin color light enough to be perceived as white, referred to as "passing". The film stars Tessa Thompson, Ruth Negga, André Holland, Bill Camp, Gbenga Akinnagbe, Antoinette Crowe-Legacy, and Alexander Skarsgård.

Passing had its world premiere at the 2021 Sundance Film Festival on January 30, 2021, and began a limited theatrical release on October 27, 2021, prior to streaming on Netflix on November 10. The film received acclaim from critics, who praised Hall's screenplay and direction, and performances of Thompson and Negga. The film was named one of the top ten films of 2021 by the African American Film Critics Association. For her performance, Negga was nominated for the Golden Globe Award, BAFTA and Screen Actors Guild Award in the category of Best Supporting Actress.

Plot
In 1920s New York City, Irene Redfield, a light-skinned black woman living in Harlem, meets a childhood friend, Clare Bellew, by chance at a hotel dining room. While Irene is married to a Black doctor, the also light-skinned Clare "passes" as white and has married a wealthy white man from Chicago named John.

Clare invites Irene up to her hotel room so they can talk more openly. Clare explains that after her father died, she was raised by her two white aunts and married John very young. They are interrupted by John, who openly despises and degrades Black people, unaware of his wife's or Irene's racial background. Irene leaves the hotel, angry with Clare, and refuses to respond to Clare's letters. However, after Clare unexpectedly shows up at Irene's home and apologizes for the encounter, they rekindle their friendship.

Clare, who wishes to associate with black people again, invites herself to a dance party that Irene is organizing. Most of the guests at the party find Clare charming, including Irene's husband, Brian. While there, Irene reveals Clare's secret to her friend, novel writer Hugh Wentworth, who seems less impressed with Clare than the others.

As time passes, Clare soon becomes involved in all aspects of Irene's life, joining Irene and Brian to all their outings. At first, Irene seems happy to have Clare around, but soon she becomes disillusioned with Clare, and starts to grow dissatisfied with her presence. Brian, also dissatisfied, attempts to teach his and Irene's children about racism in America, as Irene refuses to move anywhere else. However, Irene believes that the children are too young to learn about such things, inciting an argument between the two, further straining their marriage. Brian invites Clare to a tea party from which Irene purposefully excluded her.

When out shopping with her friend Felise, who is unable to pass, Irene encounters John, and hurries away as he begins to realize the truth about his wife's racial background. Irene tries to warn Clare, but decides against it when she is unable to reach her by phone.

As Brian, Irene, and Clare are on their way to Felise's Christmas party on the top floor of a seven story building, Irene asks Clare what she would do if John ever learned the truth. Clare replies that she would move back to Harlem to be with Irene, a response which Irene finds troubling. During the party, Irene remains silent, avoiding the other guests. She opens a large vertical window to smoke. Suddenly, John angrily forces himself into the apartment demanding to see Clare, who remains calm, and moves next to Irene by the window. John accuses her of being a "dirty liar" and lunges towards her, at which point Irene abruptly puts an arm across Clare's pelvis. Clare falls backwards out the window, but it is not made clear whether John pushed her, Irene pushed her, or she committed suicide.

In horror, all the other guests rush outside, not knowing whether or not Clare is dead.  After some hesitation, Irene slowly goes downstairs, where the police are questioning guests. Brian states that he believes John pushed Clare, but when asked, Irene asserts that she believes the fall was an accident. The film ends with the police declaring death by misadventure, Irene sobbing in Brian's arms, and Clare's body being carried away by medics.

Cast
Tessa Thompson as Irene "Reenie" Redfield
Ruth Negga as Clare Bellew
André Holland as Brian Redfield
Bill Camp as Hugh Wentworth
Alexander Skarsgård as John Bellew
Gbenga Akinnagbe as Dave Freedland
Antoinette Crowe-Legacy as Felise
Ashley Ware Jenkins as Zu

Production
It was announced in August 2018 that Rebecca Hall would be making her directorial debut on the adaptation of the Nella Larsen novel, with Tessa Thompson and Ruth Negga set to star in the lead roles. Hall had begun writing the film a decade earlier upon reflecting on her own family's history. When Hall presented her with a script version, Negga decided to collaborate in making it into a film as Negga was surprised the work was not more prominent, after having read the novel and was "completely astounded" by it. Thompson stated that the film would be shot in black and white. André Holland was cast in October 2019. In November 2019, Alexander Skarsgård joined the cast of the film.

With less than a month to go before filming production was set to begin, Hall was still $500,000 short on her desired $10 million budget, and had to apply for two grants to cover the difference. Filming began in November 2019 in New York City. The film is in monochrome. Benjamin Lee of The Guardian praised the use of a 4:3 aspect ratio as in this film it was "both fitting and practical given a smaller budget". Into the third week of filming, the Hugh Wentworth role, originally intended for Benedict Cumberbatch, remained uncast, and budgetary realities and the tight filming timeline meant the production would need an actor who lived in New York. On November 21, Bill Camp signed on, and filming wrapped in December after a 23-day shoot.

Release
Passing had its world premiere at the 2021 Sundance Film Festival on January 30, 2021. Shortly after, Netflix acquired distribution rights to the film for around $15 million. It also screened at the New York Film Festival on October 3, 2021. The film had a limited theatrical release on October 27, 2021, prior to streaming on Netflix on November 10.

According to Samba TV, the film was watched in 653,000 households over its first three days of release.

Reception

Critical reception

 

Kevin Maher of The Times gave the film 4 out of 5 stars, calling it, "a mesmerizing, deeply disquieting experience." Jessica Kiang, writing for Variety, wrote that the film is "unerring, deceptively delicate, quiet and immaculate, like that final fall of snow." In his review for The Guardian, Peter Bradshaw praised Hall's direction, calling the film, "a very stylish piece of work from Hall." Benjamin Lee of The Guardian, gave the film a negative review of 2 out of 5 stars, arguing that it had "disappointing lack of verve" and was "inert".

The performances of Negga and Thompson in particular received praise. In a very positive review for the Chicago Tribune, Michael Phillips gave the film a perfect score of four out of four stars, and wrote of the performances: "what Thompson and Negga accomplish on screen in this extraordinarily detailed portrait becomes a master class in incremental revelations". David Rooney of The Hollywood Reporter lauded Thompson for her "unshowy, beautifully internalized performance", and Simran Hans called Negga "magnetic" in her review for The Guardian. In Time Magazine's annual best performances of the year list, Stephanie Zacharek named Negga's performance of the best of 2021.

Accolades

References

External links
 
 
 Official screenplay

2020s English-language films
2021 directorial debut films
2021 films
2021 independent films
2021 romantic drama films
American black-and-white films
American romantic drama films
British black-and-white films
British romantic drama films
Films about race and ethnicity
Films based on American novels
Film4 Productions films
Films set in New York City
2020s American films
2020s British films